Anna Bondár and Kimberley Zimmermann were the defending champions, but chose not to participate.

Bárbara Gatica and Rebeca Pereira won the title, defeating Miriam Kolodziejová and Jesika Malečková in the final, 6–4, 6–2.

Seeds

Draw

Draw

References

External links
Main Draw

I.ČLTK Prague Open - Doubles
I.ČLTK Prague Open